Dunnerdale-with-Seathwaite is a civil parish in the South Lakeland District of Cumbria, England. It contains 18 listed buildings that are recorded in the National Heritage List for England.  All the listed buildings are designated at Grade II, the lowest of the three grades, which is applied to "buildings of national importance and special interest".  The parish is in the Lake District National Park, and is sparsely populated.  It contains the settlements of Seathwaite, part of Ulpha, and Broughton Mills.  The listed buildings include farmhouses, farm buildings, houses, bridges, potash kilns, a burial ground, a church, and a boundary stone.


Buildings

References

Citations

Sources

Lists of listed buildings in Cumbria